Shipping container architecture is a form of architecture using steel intermodal containers (shipping containers) as the main structural element. It is also referred to as cargotecture, a portmanteau of cargo with architecture, or "arkitainer". This form of architecture is often intertwined with the tiny house movement, as well as the sustainable living movement.

The use of containers as a building material has grown in popularity due to their strength, wide availability, and relatively low cost. Homes have also been built with containers because they are seen as more eco-friendly than traditional building materials such as brick and cement.

Advantages
Customized
Due to their shape and material, shipping containers can be modified to fit various purposes.
 
Strength and durability
Shipping containers are designed to be stacked in high columns and carrying heavy loads. They are also designed to resist harsh environments, such as on ocean-going vessels or sprayed with road salt while transported on roads.

Modular
All shipping containers are the same width, and most have two standard height and length measurements. As such, they provide modular elements that can be combined into larger structures. This simplifies design, planning, and transport as they are already designed to interlock for ease of mobility during transportation, structural construction is completed by simply emplacing them. Due to the containers' modular design, additional construction is as easy as stacking more containers. They can be stacked up to 12 units high when empty.

Labor
The welding and cutting of steel is considered to be specialized labor, and can increase construction expenses. Yet, overall, it is still lower than conventional construction. Unlike wood-frame construction, attachments must be welded or drilled to the outer skin, which is more time-consuming, and requires different job site equipment.

Transport
As they already conform to standard shipping sizes, pre-fabricated modules can be easily transported by ship, truck, or rail.

Availability
As a result of their widespread use, new and used shipping containers are available globally.

Expense
One of the major perks of buying container homes is that they are quite affordable. Depending on the requirements and material used, a container home will cost less compared to traditional homes

Eco-friendly
A 40 ft shipping container weighs over 3,500 kg (7,716 lbs, or 551 stone). When upcycling shipping containers, thousands of kilograms of steel are saved. In addition, when building with containers, the quantities of traditional building materials needed (i.e. bricks and cement) are reduced.

Disadvantages
Temperature
Steel conducts heat very well; containers used for human occupancy in an environment with extreme temperature variations will normally have to be better insulated than most brick, block, or wood structures.

Lack of flexibility
Although shipping containers can be combined to create bigger spaces, creating spaces different from their default size (either 20 or 40 foot) is expensive and time-consuming. Containers any longer than 40 feet will be difficult to navigate in some residential areas.

Humidity
As noted above, single wall steel conducts heat. In temperate climates, moist interior air condenses against the steel, becoming humid. Rust will form, unless the steel is well sealed and insulated.

Construction site
The size and weight of the containers will, in most cases, require them to be placed by a crane or forklift. Traditional brick, block, and lumber construction materials can often be moved by hand, even to upper stories.

Building permits
The use of steel for construction, while prevalent in industrial construction, is not widely used for residential structures. Obtaining building permits may be troublesome in some regions, due to municipalities not having seen this application before. However, in the United States, certain shipping container homes have been built in areas outside of the city's zoning code; this meant no building permits were required.

Treatment of timber floors
To meet Australian government quarantine requirements, most container floors, when manufactured, are treated with insecticides containing copper (23–25%), chromium (38–45%) and arsenic (30–37%). Chromium and arsenic are known carcinogens. Before human habitation, floors should be removed and safely disposed of. Units with steel floors would be preferable, if available.

Cargo spillages
A container can carry a wide variety of cargo during its working life. Spillages or contamination may have occurred on the inside surfaces, and will have to be cleaned before habitation. Ideally, all internal surfaces must be abrasive blasted to bare metal, and re-painted with a nontoxic paint system.

Solvents
Solvents released from paint, and sealants used in manufacture, might be harmful to human health.

Damage
While in service, containers are damaged by friction, handling collisions, and force of heavy loads overhead during ship transits.  The companies will inspect containers, and condemn them if there are cracked welds, twisted frames, or pin holes are found, among other faults.

Roof weaknesses
Although the two ends of a container are extremely strong, the roof is not. In the case of a 20' container, the roof is built and tested to withstand a 300 kg (660 lb) load, applied to an area of 61 cm by 30.5 cm (2' by 1') in the weakest part of the roof.

Examples

Many structures based on shipping containers have already been constructed, and their uses, sizes, locations and appearances vary widely.

When futurist Stewart Brand needed a place to assemble all the material he needed to write How Buildings Learn, he converted a shipping container into an office space, and wrote up the conversion process in the same book.

In 2006, Southern California Architect Peter DeMaria, designed the first two-story shipping container home in the U.S., as an approved structural system under the strict guidelines of the nationally recognized Uniform Building Code (UBC). This home was the Redondo Beach House, and it inspired the creation of Logical Homes, a cargo container based pre-fabricated home company. In 2007, Logical Homes created their flagship project - the Aegean, for the Computer Electronics Show in Las Vegas, Nevada.

Several architects, such as Adam Kalkin, have built original homes, using discarded shipping containers for their parts, or using them in their original form, or doing a mix of both.

In 2000, the firm Urban Space Management completed the project called Container City I in the Trinity Buoy Wharf area of London. The firm has gone on to complete additional container-based building projects, with more underway. In 2006, the Dutch company Tempohousing finished, in Amsterdam, the biggest container village in the world: 1,000 student homes from modified shipping containers from China.

In 2002, standard ISO shipping containers began to be modified, and used as stand-alone on-site wastewater treatment plants. The use of containers creates a cost-effective, modular, and customizable solution to on-site waste water treatment, and eliminates the need for construction of a separate building to house the treatment system.

Brian McCarthy, an MBA student, saw many poor neighborhoods in Ciudad Juárez, Mexico, during an MBA field trip in the 2000s. Since then, he developed prototypes of shipping container housing for maquiladora workers in Mexico.

In 2006, Village Underground constructed a series of not-for-profit artists' workspaces in Shoreditch, London. Developing the concept further, Auro Foxcroft conceived the idea to add London Underground Tube carriages as part of its recycled shipping container architecture.

Application for the Live Event & Entertainment Industry: 

In 2010, German architect and production designer Stefan Beese utilized six 12 meter long shipping containers, to create a large viewing deck and a VIP lounge area, to substitute the typical grand stand scaffolding structure at the Voodoo Music Experience, New Orleans. The containers also double as storage space for other festival components throughout the year. The two top containers are cantilevered 2.7 meters on each side, creating two balconies that are prime viewing locations. There were also two bars located on the balconies. Each container was perforated with cutouts spelling the word "VOODOO," which brands the structure, and creates different vantage points and service area openings. Since the openings themselves act as signage for the event, no additional materials or energy were needed to create banners or posters.

In the United Kingdom, walls of containers filled with sand have been used as giant sandbags, to protect against the risk of flying debris from exploding ceramic insulators in electricity substations.

In October 2013, two barges owned by Google with superstructures made out of shipping containers received media attention, speculating about their purpose.

Markets 

Empty shipping containers are commonly used as market stalls and warehouses in the countries of the former USSR. 

Informally named "Tolchok", and officially known as the Seventh-Kilometer Market, it has 16,000 vendors and employs 1,200 security guards and maintenance workers.

In Central Asia, the Dordoy Bazaar in Bishkek, Kyrgyzstan, almost entirely composed of double-stacked containers, is of comparable size. It is popular with travelers coming from Kazakhstan and Russia, to take advantage of the cheap prices and plethora of knock-off designers.

In 2011, the Cashel Mall in Christchurch, New Zealand reopened in a series of shipping containers, months after it had been destroyed in the earthquake that devastated the city's central business district. Starbucks Coffee has also built a store using shipping containers. A pop-up mall Boxpark was also created in Shoreditch London in 2011, followed by other locations in the Greater London area. A pop-up shopping mall, Common Ground, was created in Seoul, South Korea in 2016.

Other uses 

Shipping containers have also been used as:
 Affordable housing
 Press boxes
 Emergency hurricane shelters for thoroughbred horses
 Concession stands
 Fire training facility
 Military training facility
 Emergency shelters
 School buildings
 Apartment and office buildings
 Artists' studios
 Stores
 Moveable exhibition spaces on rails
 Telco hubs
 Bank vaults
 Medical clinics
 Radar stations
 Shopping malls
 Sleeping rooms
 Recording studios
 Abstract art
 Transportable factories
 Modular data centers (e.g. Sun Modular Datacenter, Portable Modular Data Center)
 Experimental labs
 Combatant temporary containment (ventilated)
 Bathrooms
 Showers
 Starbucks stores (e.g. 6350 N. Broadway, Chicago, IL 60660 USA)
 Workshops
 Intermodal sealed storage on ships, trucks, and trains
 House foundations on unstable seismic zones
 Elevator/stairwell shafts
 Block roads and keep protesters away, as photo journalized during the Pakistan Long March
 Hotels
 Construction trailers
 Mine site accommodations
 Exploration camp
 Aviation maintenance facilities for the United States Marine Corps when loaded onto the SS Wright (T-AVB-3) or the SS Curtiss (T-AVB-4)
 RV campers
 Food trucks
 Hydroponics farms
 Battery storage units
 Temporary prisons
 Intensive-care units in temporary hospitals during the COVID-19 pandemic

For housing and other architecture

Containers are in many ways an ideal building material because they are strong, durable, stackable, cuttable, movable, modular, plentiful, and relatively cheap. Architects, as well as laypeople, have used them to build many types of buildings such as homes, offices, apartments, schools, dormitories, artists' studios, and emergency shelters; they have also been used as swimming pools. They are also used to provide temporary secure spaces on construction sites, and other venues on an "as is" basis, instead of building shelters.  CONEX containers were developed by Malcolm MacClean to standardize the intermodal shipping unit.   

CONEX containers may or may not meet the requirements of local building codes.   As they are not field erected, a registered engineer or architect must verify that the containers comply with the structural requirements of the building code.  The 2021 ICC code was amended to address CONEX containers.  

Phillip C. Clark filed for a United States patent on November 23, 1987, described as "Method for converting one or more steel shipping containers into a habitable building at a building site and the product thereof".  This patent was granted August 8, 1989 as patent 4854094. The patent documentation shows what are possibly the earliest recorded plans for constructing shipping container housing and shelters by laying out some very basic architectural concepts. Regardless, the patent may not have represented novel invention at its time of filing. Paul Sawyers previously described extensive shipping container buildings used on the set of the 1985 film Space Rage Breakout on Prison Planet.

Other examples of earlier container architecture concepts also exist, such as a 1977 report entitled 'Shipping Containers as Structural Systems', investigating the feasibility of using twenty-foot shipping containers as structural elements by the US military.

During the 1991 Gulf War, containers saw considerable nonstandard uses, not only as makeshift shelters, but also for housing of US soldiers.  The shipping containers were equipped with air conditioning units and provide shelter as well as protection from artillery shelling.   

Rumours have it that some shipping containers were used for transportation of Iraqi prisoners of war. Holes were cut in the containers to allow for ventilation. Containers continue to be used for military shelters, often additionally fortified by adding sandbags to the side walls, to protect against weapons such as rocket-propelled grenades ("RPGs").

The abundance and relative cheapness of these containers during the last decade comes from the deficit in manufactured goods coming from North America in the last two decades.  These manufactured goods come to North America from Asia and, to a lesser extent, Europe, in containers that often have to be shipped back empty, or "deadhead", at considerable expense. It is often cheaper to buy new containers in Asia than to ship old ones back. Therefore, new applications are sought for the used containers that have reached their North American destination.

Media 
Shipping container architecture has inspired the reality television series: Containables (DIY) and Container Homes (HGTV), in addition to being featured in episodes of Grand Designs (Channel 4) and Amazing Interiors (Netflix).

See also 

 Affordable housing
 Alternative housing
 Containerized housing unit
 Tiny house movement
 Shipping container clinic
 Containerization
 Modular building
 Prefabricated building
 Upcycling
 Off-the-grid

References

Further reading 
 Books
Kotnik, Jure (2008). Container Architecture. p. 240. 
Sawyers, Paul (2005, 2008). Intermodal Shipping Container Small Steel Buildings. p 116. 
Bergmann, Buchmeier, Slawik, Tinney (2010). Container Atlas: A Practical Guide to Container Architecture. p. 256. 
Minguet, Josep Maria (2013). Sustainable Architecture: Containers2.  p. 111. 
Kramer, Sibylle (2014). The Box Architectural Solutions with Containers. p. 182. 
Broto, Carles (2015). Radical Container Architecture. p. 240. 

 Journals
 
 Helsel, Sand 'Future Shack: Sean Godsell's prototype emergency housing redeploys the ubiquitous shipping container' Architecture Australia, September–October 2001 
 Myers, Steven Lee 'From Soviet-Era Flea Market to a Giant Makeshift Mall', The New York Times, May 19, 2006

Architectural styles
Building engineering
Intermodal containers
Prefabricated buildings